Battle group may refer to:
 Battlegroup (army), the basic building block of an army's fighting force
 Battleship battle group, a battleship and its escorts
 Carrier battle group, a carrier and its escorts
 Battlegroup of the European Union, an army battle group project of the European Union
 Battle group, a subunit of a United States pentomic division